Lele  (also spelled Bashilele, Usilele) is a language spoken mainly in the west edge of the Kasai-Occidental Province, in Ilebo and Tshikapa territories; the extreme east of the Bandundu Province, in Idiofa and Gungu territories of the Democratic Republic of the Congo.

References

Languages of the Democratic Republic of the Congo
Bushoong languages